The 22nd South American Junior Championships in Athletics were held in Bogotá, Colombia, at the Estadio El Campín from July 13–15, 1990.

Participation (unofficial)
Detailed result lists can be found on the "World Junior Athletics History" website.  An unofficial count yields the number of about 250 athletes from about 10 countries:  Argentina (20), Bolivia (3), Brazil (54), Chile (22), Colombia (50), Ecuador (40), Panama (10), Paraguay (2), Peru (15), Venezuela (34).

Medal summary
Medal winners are published for men and women
Complete results can be found on the "World Junior Athletics History" website.

Men

Women

Medal table (unofficial)

References

External links
World Junior Athletics History

South American U20 Championships in Athletics
1990 in Colombian sport
South American U20 Championships
1990 in South American sport
International athletics competitions hosted by Colombia
1990 in youth sport
July 1990 sports events in South America